Mariam Batsashvili (Georgian: მარიამ ბაწაშვილი) is a classical pianist from Georgia.

Biography 

Batsashvili started playing piano when she was 5 under Natalia Natsvlishvili at the E. Mikeladze Central Music School before continuing at the Hochschule für Musik Franz Liszt in Weimar with Grigory Gruzman.
In 2014, she won the 10th Franz Liszt Piano Competition in Utrecht, after having already triumphed in the International Franz Liszt Competition for Young Pianists in Weimar in 2011.

The following year, she had received the Arturo Benedetti Michelangeli Prize and she spent the 2016-17 season as a ‘Rising Star’ of the European Concert Hall Organization (ECHO).

Since 2017 she has been an official Yamaha artist.

Between 2017 and 2019, Mariam Batsashvili was one of the BBC's New Generation Artists 

In 2019, her debut album with Warner Classics (Chopin-Liszt) was released.

References 

21st-century classical pianists
21st-century musicians from Georgia (country)
Classical pianists from Georgia (country)
Women pianists from Georgia (country)
Living people
1993 births